Candidula is a genus of air-breathing land snails, terrestrial pulmonate gastropod mollusks in the family Geomitridae,
.  the hairy snails and their allies. 

The genus is characterized by the presence of a big dart sac, a sac containing an arrow-like structure found on a land snail's reproductive organs.

Species
Species within the genus Candidula s.l. include:
 Candidula candidescens A. J. Wagner, 1928 (taxon inquirendum)
 Candidula castriota Soós, 1924
 Candidula cavannae (Paulucci, 1881)
 Candidula codia (Bourguignat, 1859)
 Candidula eustricta (Bourguignat, 1863) 
 Candidula lernaea Hausdorf, 1991
 Candidula rhabdotoides (Wagner, 1928)
 Candidula rugosiuscula (Michaud, 1831)
 † Candidula soosi (Gaál, 1910) 
 Candidula syrensis (Pfeiffer, 1846) species-complex! (taxon inquirendum)
 Candidula unifasciata (Poiret, 1801) - type species
 Candidula verticillata (Pfeiffer, 1871) (taxon inquirendum, generic affiliation unclear)

Species brought into synonymy
 Candidula arganica (Servain, 1880): synonym of Zarateana arganica (Servain, 1880) (invalid combination)
 Candidula belemensis (Servain, 1880): synonym of Xeroplexa belemensis (Servain, 1880)
 Candidula camporroblensis (Fez, 1944): synonym of Backeljaia camporroblensis (Fez, 1944) (invalid combination)
 Candidula corbellai Martínez-Ortí, 2011: synonym of Backeljaia corbellai (Martínez-Ortí, 2011) (original combination)
 Candidula coudensis Holyoak & Holyoak, 2010: synonym of Xeroplexa coudensis (Holyoak & Holyoak, 2010) (original combination)
 Candidula fiorii (Alzona & Alzona Bisacchi, 1938): synonym of Xerogyra fiorii (Alzona & Alzona Bisachii, 1938) (invalid combination)
 Candidula gigaxii (Pfeiffer, 1847): synonym of Backeljaia gigaxii (L. Pfeiffer, 1847) (invalid combination)
 Candidula grovesiana (Paulucci, 1881): synonym of Xerogyra grovesiana (Paulucii, 1881) (invalid combination)
 Candidula intersecta (Poiret, 1801): synonym of Xeroplexa intersecta (Poiret, 1801) (invalid combination)
 Candidula najerensis (Ortiz de Zárate y López, 1950): synonym of Backeljaia najerensis (Ortiz de Zárate y López, 1950) (invalid combination)
 Candidula olisippensis (Servain, 1880): synonym of Xeroplexa olisippensis (Servain, 1880) (invalid combination)
 Candidula rocandioi (Ortiz de Zárate y López, 1950): synonym of Zarateana rocandioi (Ortiz de Zárate y López, 1950) (invalid combination)
 Candidula setubalensis (Pfeiffer, 1850): synonym of Xeroplexa setubalensis (L. Pfeiffer, 1850) (invalid combination)
 Candidula spadae (Calcara, 1845): synonym of Xerogyra spadae (Calcara, 1845) (invalid combination)
 † Candidula striataformis (Lörenthey, 1906): synonym of  † Helicella striataformis (Lörenthey, 1906)
 Candidula ultima (Mousson, 1872): synonym of Orexana ultima (Mousson, 1872) (invalid combination)

Taxonomy
Molecular phylogenetic studies revealed the polyphyly of the genus being divided into at least six genera

The species of Candidula s.l. should be classified as follows:

 Backeljaia
Backeljaia camporroblensis (Fez, 1944)
 Backeljaia corbellai (Martínez-Ortí, 2011)
 Backeljaia gigaxii (Pfeiffer, 1847) type species
 Backeljaia najerensis (Ortiz de Zárate y López, 1950)
Candidula
 Orexana
Orexana ultima (Mousson, 1872) type species
 Xerogyra
Xerogyra fiorii (Alzona & Alzona Bisacchi, 1938)
 Xerogyra grovesiana (Paulucci, 1881)
 Xerogyra spadae (Calcara, 1845)
 Xeroplexa
Xeroplexa arrabidensis (Holyoak & Holyoak, 2014)
 Xeroplexa belemensis (Servain, 1880): synonym of Xeroplexa belemensis (Servain, 1880)
 Xeroplexa carrapateirensis (Holyoak & Holyoak, 2014)
 Xeroplexa coudensis (Holyoak & Holyoak, 2010)
 Xeroplexa intersecta (Poiret, 1801)
 Xeroplexa olisippensis (Servain, 1880)
 Xeroplexa ponsulensis (Holyoak & Holyoak, 2014)
 Xeroplexa scabiosula (Locard, 1899)
 Xeroplexa setubalensis (Pfeiffer, 1850) type species
 Xeroplexa strucki (Maltzan, 1886)
 Zarateana
Zarateana arganica (Servain, 1880) type species
 Zarateana rocandioi (Ortiz de Zárate y López, 1950)

References

 Bank, R. A. (2017). Classification of the Recent terrestrial Gastropoda of the World. Last update: July 16th, 2017.

External links
 Monterosato, T. A. di. (1892). Molluschi terrestri delle isole adiacenti alla Sicilia. Atti della Reale Accademia di Scienze, Lettere e Belle Arti di Palermo. 3rd Series, 2: 1-34
 Chueca, L. J., Gómez-Moliner, B. J., Madeira, M. J. & Pfenninger, M. (2018). Molecular phylogeny of Candidula (Geomitridae) land snails inferred from mitochondrial and nuclear markers reveals the polyphyly of the genus. Molecular Phylogenetics and Evolution. 118: 357-368

 
Gastropod genera